is a Japanese children's storybook series. The books take the form of horror anthologies, edited by Miyoko Matsutani and illustrated by Yoshikazu Takai and Kumiko Katō. As of 2007, there were 50 volumes published by Doshinsha. Over 8 million copies of the books have published so far.

The books were adapted into a TV anime series by Toei Animation, which began airing in 2009.  It derives its name from "kaidan", which loosely translates to "thriller" (from "kai", meaning strange, mysterious, rare or bewitching apparition, and "dan", meaning talk or recited narrative; a more direct translation would be a ghost or horror story). Rather than forming a linear plot, the anime follows the anthology format of the book and tells a collection of ghost stories similar to what would be traditionally told around a campfire. The anime was frequently among the 10 highest rated anime shows of the week in Japan.

The series was adapted into a hybrid live-action and anime feature film in 2010 starring Ayano Kudo.

Plot
There is a loose theme throughout the series of the "Thriller Restaurant", which is introduced in the first episode.  The remainder of the series is a collection of ghost stories reminiscent of the Scary Stories anthology and Kwaidan.

Each episode is broken up into three "dishes", namely the Appetizer, the Main Dish, and the Dessert.  The "Appetizer" is a short story featuring something supernatural, such as ghosts, spirits, or similar.  The "Main Dish" is a longer ghost story similar to the Appetizer, usually with a twist.  The "Dessert" is a ghost story told by one of the main characters while playing . These involve characters not related to the series and end with some sort of a moral lesson. From the thirteenth episode onwards, a fourth story is told while the ending score plays, replacing the original animation; these stories have a scary picture shown when the music ends.

Characters

Main characters

Ako is a grade schooler currently attending Yamazakura Elementary School. She is a bright and cheerful girl, who wants to write novels when she'll grow up. She doesn't have a fascination about ghost stories in general, but her will to always find out the truth doesn't let her walk away from a mystery.

She is the first of her classmates to make friends with Sho after his transfer to Yamazakura.

Sho is a new transfer student at Yamazakura, who has recently moved back to Japan. He is handsome and is popular with the girls, although he likes being alone and doesn't have many friends. He loves ghost stories and has a whole room full of scary stories, he collects them from all around the world. He can also read rōmaji.

Reiko is the class representative for Ako's class.  She has a strong defiance towards everything even seemingly supernatural, but still tags along every time it is concerned. Her reasons are revealed as the story progresses.

The ghost garçon (waiter) is the manager of the Restaurant. He introduces every meal. He typically appears during the opening credits, and after the main course, to wrap up the show.

Supporting characters

One of Ako's classmates.

One of Ako's friends.

Ako's mother.

Ako's father.

Ako's younger brother.

Episode list

Anime

Music

Anime series

The ending theme is "Lost Boy", performed by SEAMO.

References to mythology and modern culture
 In episode three, "Passenger on a Rainy Night" is about a girl getting a taxi ride to her house, where she is revealed to already be dead.  This is a version of an urban legend, where a person (usually a young woman) gets a ride from the place of her death to an address, usually the house of a relative or close friend.

References

External links
 Kaidan Restaurants Official Anime Website 
 DailyRadar's AnimeBlip Page on Kaidan Restaurant
 

Japanese children's animated horror television series
Horror anime and manga
Mystery anime and manga
TV Asahi original programming
Shōnen manga
Supernatural anime and manga
Toei Animation television
Japanese supernatural horror films
Japanese mystery films